Ejutla may refer to:

Ejutla de Crespo, Oaxaca, Mexico
Ejutla, Jalisco, Mexico